John Christopher Fitzgerald (7 October 1864 – 22 December 1936) was an Australian politician. A five-time mayor of the Town of Port Pirie, he was a Labor Party member of the South Australian House of Assembly from 1918 to 1936, representing the multi-member seat of Port Pirie.

Early life and career
Fitzgerald was born in Wallaroo, and moved to Port Pirie with his family at age ten. His family brought two cows with them, and Fitzgerald became the first milk vendor in Port Pirie. He attended a private school until the Pirie School opened, after which he attended there. After leaving school, he worked on the Port Broughton railway line, carted pipes to the Nelshaby Reservoir and worked in Dunn's mill in Port Pirie.

While still in his youth, Fitzgerald went to Broken Hill to prospect, and partnering with Duncan McCulloch, established the Britannia-Scotia mine there. He transported the first load of ore from Broken Hill to Port Pirie, for which they split a cheque for £1,000. He continued to work the mine for a time, but was forced to close due to rising water levels. He bought early shares in BHP with his proceeds, but sold out before the company's boom as his parents needed money. He returned to Port Pirie in 1886, where he married Miss Hannan.

Second Boer War service and Port Pirie councillor
Fitzgerald worked in the smelters refinery and as a farmer following his return from Broken Hill. In January 1901, he enlisted in the Boer War, where he served with the Fifth Bushmen's Contingent, being promoted to regimental quartermaster and warrant officer while on active service. Following his return from the war on 26 April 1902, he worked on the wharves at Port Pirie, where he served as president of the Waterside Workers' Federation. He was elected as a Corporate Town of Port Pirie councillor in 1905–06, but was forced to resign after a year for health reasons. During the 1910s, he left the wharves and acquired land for farming at Wirrabara. He unsuccessfully contested the 1912 and 1915 state elections.

State politician and mayor of Port Pirie
Fitzgerald was elected to the House of Assembly at the 1918 state election. He also successfully returned to council, serving as mayor of Port Pirie in 1922-23 and 1925–27. He died in office in December 1936 while still serving as both state MP and local alderman and was buried at Port Pirie Cemetery.

References

 

1864 births
1936 deaths
Members of the South Australian House of Assembly
Australian Labor Party members of the Parliament of South Australia
Australian military personnel of the Second Boer War